First German Sport Club Phoenix (commonly known as Phoenix SC) is an American soccer club based in Feasterville, Pennsylvania. The club plays in the United Soccer League, a Region I soccer league that's under the United States Adult Soccer Association umbrella, which represents the fifth-tier of the United States soccer league system.

The club is notable for qualifying into the First Round proper of the 2011 Lamar Hunt U.S. Open Cup before they fell 2–1 to Rochester Rhinos, a third division team in the USL Pro.

Phoenix SC has represented Eastern Pennsylvania in the amateur regional portion of the US Open Cup for the past 2 years.  Both times they have lost in regional play to the New York Pancyprian Freedoms; 3–2 in 2010 at St. John's Belsom Stadium and 1–1: 3–0 in pks in 2011 in Eastern PA.  Their overall record outside of the state since 2005 is 2–7, including a loss to the Rochester Rhinos of the USL Pro division, with both wins coming during their 2011 run.  

During the 2015-2016 campaign, Phoenix SC accomplished something that no other amateur club has ever accomplished by having its team win both the EPSA Open and Amateur Cup, along with the Over 30 team winning their respective EPSA Cup.  in all 3 competitions, Phoenix SC met Christos FC, in regional play, falling to them in the Open and Amateur by a goal in each.  The over 30s were victorious by the same difference.  The Over 30 team went on to win the Gerherd Menghel Over 30 National Championship, the first ever national championship for the club.  Blair Thomson, manager for the club, was named Region I coach of the year for the first time.

List of Accomplishments

 2002–03 EPSA Amateur Cup Champions
 2006–07 EPSA Amateur Cup Champions
 2007–08 USL League Champions
 2008  Pittsburgh Shop 'n' Save Tournament Champions
 2008–09 USL League Champions
 2008–09 EPSA Amateur Cup Champions
 2009 Philadelphia Champions Cup Winner
 2009–10 EPSA Open Cup Champions
 2009–10 EPSA Amateur Cup Champions
 2010 Neptune Soccer Classic Tournament Champions
 2010–11 USL League Champion
 2010–11 EPSA Open Cup Champion – Eventual National Quarterfinalist
 2011 Region I Representative – US Open Cup
 2010–11 EPSA Amateur Cup Champion
 2011–12 EPSA Amateur Cup Champion
 2011–12 USL League Champion
 2012–13 USL League Champion
 2013–2014 USL League Champion
 2014–2015 EPSA Over 30 Cup Champion
 2015–2016 EPSA Amateur Cup Champion
 2015–2016 EPSA Open Cup Champion
 2015-2016 EPSA Over 30 Cup Champion
 2016 Region I Open Cup Semi Finalist
 2016 Region I Amateur Cup Semi Finalist
 2016 Region 1 Over 30 Champion
 2016 National Champion Gerhard Menghel Over 30 Cup
 2018 EPSA Over 30 cup Champion
 14 time defending champion – Danubia Season Kick-off

External links
 United Soccer League Team Profile
 Phoenix SC

Soccer clubs in Pennsylvania